Leo Schaya (1916–1985) was a Swiss author and scholar whose works focused on the Sufi tradition, the Kabbalah, and the Traditionalist School.

Biography
Born in Switzerland, Schaya lived much of his adult life in Nancy, France.  He grew up in a traditional Jewish household and from his early youth he was interested in the works of neo-Platonism, Sufism and Advaita Vedanta.

He published several articles on the Kabbalah. He also wrote a book on the Sufi doctrine of unity.  He is the founder of the journal Connaissance des religions (Knowledge of Religions).

Traditionalism
Schaya was a friend and frequent correspondent of prominent Traditionalist Frithjof Schuon.

Bibliography
In English
Sufism: Love and Wisdom (World Wisdom. 2006) 
The Universal Meaning of Kabbalah (Fons Vitae; Tra edition, 2004) 
Seeing God Everywhere (contributed essay) (World Wisdom, 2004) 

In French
L'Homme et l'Absolu selon la kabbale (Dervy, 1999) 
Naissance a l'esprit (Collection "Mystiques et religions") (Dervy-Livres, 1987) 
La doctrina sufí de la unidad (José J. de Olañeta, 1985) 
La creation en Dieu: A la lumiere du judaisme, du christianisme et de l'islam (Dervy-Livres, 1983) 
La doctrine Soufique de l'unite (Initiation a l'Islam) (A.-Maisonneuve, 1981)

See also

Traditionalist School

References

Further reading
Leo Schaya's essay "The Eliatic Function"(about the esoteric function of the prophet Elijah)

External links
Leo Schaya: Life and Works

1916 births
1985 deaths
English-language writers
Swiss Jews
Swiss writers in French
Jewish writers
Kabbalists
Traditionalist School